Denyse Julien (born July 22, 1960, in Rouyn-Noranda, Quebec) is a former badminton player from Canada noted for her versatility and longevity.

Career
Between 1981 and 2004 Julien won a record 31 Canadian National Championship events, thirteen in singles, eight in women's doubles, and ten in mixed doubles. She also captured five events at the Canadian Open Championships, including women's singles in 1989. Julien earned four individual medals at the quadrennial Commonwealth Games. These include a silver medal in singles (1990), and a silver (1986) and two bronzes (1990, 1994) in women's doubles. Julien's record in another quadrennial competition, the Pan American Games, has been particularly noteworthy. A few months shy of her 35th birthday she won all three events at Mar del Plata, Argentina in 1995 when badminton was introduced into these Games. She won medals in each event at the next competition in Winnipeg in 1999, and a silver in women's doubles and a gold in mixed doubles at the 2003 competition in Santo Domingo, Dominican Republic. 
 
Julien won a number of titles in Europe, including women's singles at French (1982) and Welsh (1991, 1995) Opens, women's doubles at the Austrian International (1983), and mixed doubles at the Portugal Open (1998). She competed in three Olympic Games (1992, 1996, 2004), the highlight of which was winning two rounds of singles at the 1992 Games in Barcelona before bowing to China's reigning world champion Tang Jiuhong.

Achievements

World Senior Championships

Commonwealth Games 
Women's doubles

Pan American Games 
Women's singles

Women's doubles

Mixed doubles

Pan Am Championships 

Women's singles

Women's doubles

Mixed doubles

IBF World Grand Prix 
The World Badminton Grand Prix was sanctioned by the International Badminton Federation from 1983 to 2006.

Women's singles

Women's doubles

Mixed doubles

IBF International

Women’s singles

Women's doubles

Mixed doubles

References

External links
 
 
 
 
 

1960 births
Living people
Canadian female badminton players
Badminton players at the 1992 Summer Olympics
Badminton players at the 1996 Summer Olympics
Badminton players at the 2004 Summer Olympics
French Quebecers
Olympic badminton players of Canada
Sportspeople from Rouyn-Noranda
Commonwealth Games silver medallists for Canada
Commonwealth Games bronze medallists for Canada
Badminton players at the 1995 Pan American Games
Badminton players at the 1999 Pan American Games
Badminton players at the 2003 Pan American Games
Pan American Games gold medalists for Canada
Pan American Games silver medalists for Canada
Pan American Games bronze medalists for Canada
Badminton players at the 1982 Commonwealth Games
Badminton players at the 1986 Commonwealth Games
Badminton players at the 1990 Commonwealth Games
Badminton players at the 1994 Commonwealth Games
Commonwealth Games medallists in badminton
Pan American Games medalists in badminton
Badminton players at the 2002 Commonwealth Games
Badminton players at the 1998 Commonwealth Games
Medalists at the 1995 Pan American Games
Medalists at the 1999 Pan American Games
Medalists at the 2003 Pan American Games
Medallists at the 1982 Commonwealth Games
Medallists at the 1986 Commonwealth Games
Medallists at the 1990 Commonwealth Games
Medallists at the 1994 Commonwealth Games